Osvaldo Peretti (born 30 April 1921) is an Argentine retired professional footballer.

He played 7 games and scored 1 goal in the 1947/48 Serie A season for A.S. Roma.

1921 births
Possibly living people
Argentine footballers
Argentine expatriate footballers
Expatriate footballers in Italy
Argentine expatriate sportspeople in Italy
Serie A players
A.S. Roma players
Piacenza Calcio 1919 players
Association football midfielders
Footballers from Buenos Aires